McIntire Run is a  long 2nd order tributary to Big Sandy Creek in Fayette County, Pennsylvania.

Course
McIntire Run rises about 2 miles south of Summit, Pennsylvania, and then flows southeast to join Big Sandy Creek about 3 miles north-northeast of Elliottsville.

Watershed
McIntire Run drains  of area, receives about 51.2 in/year of precipitation, has a wetness index of 313.93, and is about 95% forested.

See also
List of rivers of Pennsylvania

References

Rivers of Pennsylvania
Rivers of Fayette County, Pennsylvania